Paulo Henrique Martins Eugenio (born 23 April 1992 in São Paulo), known as Paulinho is a Brazilian former footballer who played as a midfielder.

Career
Paulinho started to play football in his hometown at São Paulo FC. In 2013, he also played for the lower league Brazilian teams Esporte Clube Noroeste and Mirassol Futebol Clube. On 18 June 2014 the Romanian first league team Universitatea Cluj announced the transfer of Paulinho.

References

External links

1992 births
Living people
Association football midfielders
Liga I players
FC Universitatea Cluj players
Expatriate footballers in Romania
Brazilian expatriate sportspeople in Romania
Brazilian footballers
Brazilian expatriate footballers
Footballers from São Paulo